Garrett Gobble (born May 2, 1995) is an American politician and educator serving as a member of the Iowa House of Representatives from the 38th district. Elected in November 2020, he assumed office on January 11, 2021.

Early life and education 
Gobble was born in Mount Pleasant, Iowa. After graduating from Southeastern Community College, he earned a Bachelor of Arts degree in history from the University of Iowa in 2017.

Career 
After graduating from college, Gobble moved to Iowa City, Iowa and worked as a substitute teacher and as a clerk at Hy-Vee. In 2018, he was hired by the Ankeny Community School District as an eight grade social studies teacher. He was elected to the Iowa House of Representatives in November 2020 and assumed office on January 11, 2021. Gobble also serves as vice chair of the House Education Appropriations Subcommittee.

Personal life 
Gobble's wife, Elizabeth, is an English teacher at Southeast Polk High School.

References 

1995 births
People from Mount Pleasant, Iowa
Southeastern Community College (Iowa) alumni
University of Iowa alumni
Republican Party members of the Iowa House of Representatives
People from Ankeny, Iowa
Living people